Shamweel Qasim (sometimes rendered Shamweel) is a Maldivian footballer nicknamed "Bonda", who plays as midfielder for New Radiant SC. He is a member of the Maldives national football team. He is from the island of Hithadhoo, Addu Atoll.

Personal life
Shamweel is married and he is a father of two children.

Honours

Maldives
 SAFF Championship: 2008

External links 
Maldivesoccer Bonda profile
FIFA
The Shamweel Qasim Football Academy (Facebook)

Maldivian footballers
Maldives international footballers
New Radiant S.C. players
Club Valencia players
Living people
Association football midfielders
Year of birth missing (living people)